In mathematics, the first uncountable ordinal, traditionally denoted by  or sometimes by , is the smallest ordinal number that, considered as a set, is uncountable. It is the supremum (least upper bound) of all countable ordinals.

Like any ordinal number (in von Neumann's approach),  is a well-ordered set, with set membership serving as the order relation.  is a limit ordinal, i.e. there is no ordinal  such that .

The cardinality of the set  is the first uncountable cardinal number,  (aleph-one).

To generalize: if  is an arbitrary ordinal, we define  as the initial ordinal of the cardinal .

The existence of  can be proven without the axiom of choice. For more, see Hartogs number.

Topological properties 
Any ordinal number can be turned into a topological space by using the order topology.

The reason is that the union (i.e., supremum) of every countable set of countable ordinals is another countable ordinal.

The topological space  is sequentially compact, but not compact. As a consequence, it is not metrizable. It is, however, countably compact and thus not Lindelöf (a countably compact space is compact if and only if it is Lindelöf). In terms of axioms of countability,  is first-countable, but neither separable nor second-countable. 

The space  is compact and not first-countable.  is used to define the long line and the Tychonoff plank—two important counterexamples in topology.

See also
 Epsilon numbers (mathematics)
 Large countable ordinal
 Ordinal arithmetic

References

Bibliography
 Thomas Jech, Set Theory, 3rd millennium ed., 2003, Springer Monographs in Mathematics, Springer, .
 Lynn Arthur Steen and J. Arthur Seebach, Jr., Counterexamples in Topology. Springer-Verlag, New York, 1978. Reprinted by Dover Publications, New York, 1995.  (Dover edition).

Ordinal numbers
Topological spaces